Merrifieldia diwani is a moth of the family Pterophoridae that is found in Iran.

The forewings are cream white with white fringes. The hindwings are white, although the last segment is brown.

Adults have been recorded in May and June.

References

Moths described in 1981
diwani
Endemic fauna of Iran
Moths of the Middle East